

Events and publications

January
 January 22: The final episode of Charles M. Schulz' Li'l Folks is published.
January 30: The first episode of Mickey Mouse, Eega Beeva and the Mook Treasure by Bill Walsh and Floyd Gottfredson is published. The story, published at the height of the Cold War, is overly anti-communist and portrays the villain Peg-Leg Pete as a Soviet officer.
 In Walt Disney's Comics and Stories Carl Barks creates the Donald Duck story Rip Van Donald, a parody of Rip Van Winkle.

February
 February 9: Marc Sleen's version of De Lustige Kapoentjes makes its debut in 't Kapoentje.
 February 9: in Spirou, first strip of Les chapeaux noirs, by Andrè Franquin.
 February 20: Elliot Caplin and John Cullen Murphy's Big Ben Bolt debuts.
Captain America's Weird Tales (1941 series) #75 – Timely Comics – (After issue 75, the series will be cancel for 4 years and will be rename back to Captain America Comics)
Venus (1948 series) #8 – Timely Comics

March
 March 16: Barry Appleby's The Gambols makes its debut.
March 21: Carl Barks' story Ancient Persia is published.
March 23: In Tintin magazine the  first chapter of The mystery of the great pyramid, by Edgar P. Jacobs appears in pint. 
 Syd Shores and Stan Lee's Tex Taylor is cancelled by Atlas with issue #9. 
 Black Rider debuts with issue #8, taking over the numbering of Western Winners — Atlas Comics
Cowboy Romances (1939 series) #3 – Timely Comics – Renamed to Young Men
True Western (1939 series) #2 – Timely Comics – Renamed to True Adventures

April
 April 1: The Nero story De Hoed van Geeraard de Duivel is first published in the newspapers. Halfway the story the main cast member Madam Pheip makes her debut.
 April 8: Marc Sleen's Doris Dobbel makes its debut.
  April 14: The first issue of the British comics magazine Eagle is published. It will run (in two incarnations) until 1994. In its first issue Frank Hampson's Dan Dare makes its debut.
 Crypt of Terror debuts with issue #17 (April/May cover date), continuing the numbering of Crime Patrol — EC Comics
 The Vault of Horror debuts with issue #12 (April/May cover date), continuing the numbering of War Against Crime — EC Comics
Trail of the unicorn, by Carl Barks.
Topolino e I grilli atomici (Mickey Mouse and the Atomic Crickets) by Guido Martina and Angelo Bioletto is first published in the Italian Disney comics magazine Topolino. In this story Mickey Mouse and Goofy meet the Seven Dwarfs.

May
 Andrea Lavezzolo and EsseGesse's Kinowa makes its debut.
 Weird Fantasy debuts with issue #13 (May/June cover date), continuing the numbering of A Moon, A Girl... Romance — EC Comics
True Adventures (1939 series) #3 – Timely Comics – Renamed to Men's Adventures
Venus (1948 series) #9 – Timely Comics

June
 After having received a letter of complaint from Hilda Terry in October 1949 the National Cartoonists Society allows female cartoonists too as members. Terry, Barbara Shermund and Edwina Dumm are the first women to become members of their society.
 Cancellation of Gian Giacomo Dalmasso and Ingam (Enzo Magni)'s Pantera Bionda.
Wild about flowers, by Carl Barks
Young Men (1939 series) #4 – Timely Comics

July
 July 27: Bob De Moor's Barelli makes his debut in Tintin.

August
August 25: In the album The Blood Pact, Tex Willer marries the Indian squaw Lylith (who will die within a year).
Men's Adventures (1939 series) #4 – Timely Comics
Strange Adventures #1 – DC Comics

September
 September 4: Mort Walker's Beetle Bailey makes its debut. Though the original comic strip is set at college and will only be set at a military base in March 1951.
 September 5: The Nero story Moea Papoea is first published in the newspapers. Halfway the story the main cast member Petoetje makes his debut.
 September 7: Hergé falls into a clinical depression and goes on a rest cure to Switzerland. For 18 months no new The Adventures of Tintin episodes appear in the eponymous Tintin magazine.
 September 14: In the Donald Duck story A Financial Fable by Carl Barks Scrooge McDuck is seen swimming in his money for the first time.
 September 15: The first issue of the Dutch comics magazine Grabbelton is published, a supplement of De Katholieke Illustratie. it will last until 4 September 1954.
 September 24: Kreigh Collins' Mitzi McCoy changes its title to Kevin the Bold. It will continue under this title until 1968, whereupon it changes to another title, Up Anchor, and continues until 1972. 
Young Men (1939 series) #5 – Timely Comics

October
 Tales from the Crypt debuts with issue #20 (October/November cover date), continuing the numbering of Crypt of Terror — EC Comics
 October 2: Charles M. Schulz' Peanuts appears for the first time in seven US newspapers. In the first episode Charlie Brown makes his debut (although he originated in Schulz' previous series Li'l Folks).
 October 4: In Charles M. Schulz' Peanuts the character Snoopy makes its debut.
 October 14: The first issue of the Belgian Disney comics magazine Mickey Magazine is published. It will run until September 1959. 
 October 19: The Spirou et Fantasio story Il y a un sorcier à Champignac by André Franquin with Jean Darc is prepublished in Spirou and marks the debut of the Count of Champignac.

November
 November 13: Jack Kent's King Aroo makes its debut.
 November 27: Dick Brooks's The Jackson Twins makes its debut.
Men's Adventures (1939 series) #5 – Timely Comics

December
 Marvel Boy (1950 series) #1 – Timely Comics
Young Men (1939 series) #6 – Timely Comics

Specific date unknown
The U.S. comics industry comes to a turning point. The Golden Age of Comic Books is ending, and the rise of crime comics, romance comics, Western comics, horror comics, and science fiction comics signals the start of the new decade. 
 In the movies, Destination Moon is the first color science fiction film, and the first big budget science fiction film since Things to Come in 1936. DC Comics is quick to pick up on the renewed interest of the public in science fiction, and a still from Destination Moon is cover of the new science fiction comic book Strange Adventures, soon joined by a companion book Mystery in Space.
 EC Comics is at the height of their all-too-brief trajectory, with science fiction comics Weird Science and Weird Fantasy.
 Dell Comics publishes a large number of Western comics, dedicated to celebrities such as Roy Rogers and Gene Autry.
 The comic strip reprint comics, which had started the comic book phenomenon, are disappearing. Ace Comics, Magic Comics, and King Comics end their long runs. Attempts to bring out single character comic strip reprints, such as Flash Gordon, Steve Canyon, and Terry and the Pirates fold after short runs.
 In Greece Themos Andreopoulos establishes the comics magazine Tam-Tam.

Births

March
 March 14: Dudu Geva, Israeli comics artist, cartoonist and caricaturist (The Duck), (d. 2005) from a heart attack.

November
 November: Zyx, Canadian cartoonist and comics artist (Sombre Vilain), (d. 2015).

Deaths

May
 May 18: Jenö Jeney, Hungarian illustrator, editorial cartoonist and comics artist, dies at age 75.
 Specific date unknown: Mario Silva Ossa, aka Coré, Chilean illustrator and comics artist (Quentin el Aventurero), dies at age 37.

June
 June 7: W.O. Wilson, South African-American comic artist (The Richleigh Family, The Wish Twins, Madge the Magician's Daughter), dies at age 84.

July
 July 9: Salvador Bartolozzi, Spanish illustrator, theatrical set designer, comics artist (Pipo y Pipa, Pinocho contra Chapete) and publisher (founder of the children's magazine Pinocho), dies at age 68.
 July 26: Eduard Thöny, Austrian-German cartoonist, dies at age 84.

August
 August 1: Raoul Thomen, Belgian-French comics artist (Marius, comics based on Charlie Chaplin), dies at age 83.

October
 October 2: J. Carlos, Brazilian comics artist (Lamparina, Juquinha, Almofadinha & Melindrosa), dies of a brain stroke at age 66.

Specific date unknown
 Fred Nankivel, American illustrator and comics artist (Sing Sing Sid, Uncle Mun), dies at age 63 or 64.
 Charles W. Saalberg, American illustrator and comics artist (The Ting-Lings), passes away at age 84 or 85.

First issues by title
Collana Zenit, cover dated June 28, by Edizioni Audace (Sergio Bonelli) – collection of Western comics made in Italy.
Marvel Boy, cover dated December, by Stan Lee and Russ Heath, published by Timely Comics
Quatre aventures de Spirou et Fantasio by André Franquin, Dupuis 
 Strange Adventures cover dated August–September, published by DC Comics.

Initial appearances by character name
Akim, in Akim il figlio della giungla #1 (February), created by Roberto Renzi and Augusto Pedrazza, Edizioni Tomasina.
Deadshot in Batman #59 (June), created by David Vern Reed and Lew Schwartz – DC Comics
King Faraday in Danger Trail #1 (July), created by Robert Kanigher and Carmine Infantino – DC Comics
Kinowa, in Kinowa #1 (May), created by Andrea Lavezzolo and EsseGesse, Editoriale Dardo.  .
Knight in Batman #62 (December), created by Bill Finger and Dick Sprang – DC Comics
Lana Lang in Superboy #10 (September), created by Bill Finger and John Sikela – DC Comics
Marvel Boy in Marvel Boy #1 (December), created by Stan Lee and Russ Heath – Timely Comics

References